SN 2003fg, nicknamed the Champagne Supernova, was an unusual Type Ia supernova.  It was discovered in 2003, with the Canada-France-Hawaii Telescope and the Keck Telescope, both on Mauna Kea in Hawaii, and announced by researchers at the University of Toronto. The supernova occurred in a galaxy some 4 billion light-years from Earth. It was nicknamed after the 1995 song "Champagne Supernova" by English rock band Oasis.

It was unusual because of the mass of its progenitor. According to the current understanding, white dwarf stars explode as Type Ia supernovas when their mass approaches 1.4 solar masses, termed the Chandrasekhar limit. The mass added to the star is believed to be donated by a companion star, either from the companion's stellar wind or the overflow of its Roche lobe as it evolves.

However, the progenitor of SN 2003fg reached two solar masses before exploding.  The primary mechanism invoked to explain how a white dwarf can exceed the Chandrasekhar mass is unusually rapid rotation; the added support effectively increases the critical mass.  An alternative explanation is that the explosion resulted from the merger of two white dwarfs.  The evidence indicating a higher than normal mass comes from the light curve and spectra of the supernova—while it was particularly overluminous, the kinetic energies measured from the spectra appeared smaller than usual.  One proposed explanation is that more of the total kinetic energy budget was expended climbing out of the deeper than usual potential well.

This is important because the brightness of type Ia supernovae was thought to be essentially uniform, making them useful "standard candles" in measuring distances in the universe. Such an aberrant type Ia supernova could throw distances and other scientific work into doubt; however, the light curve characteristics of SN 2003fg were such that it would never have been mistaken for an ordinary high-redshift Type Ia supernova.

References

External links
 Light curves and spectrum on the Open Supernova Catalog
 
'Champagne supernova' challenges understanding of how supernovae work - University of Toronto
Cosmos Magazine - "Rebellious supernova confronts dark energy"
'Champagne Supernova' breaks astronomical rules - CBC
Astronomy: Champagne supernova - Nature (subscription site)
Supernovae - NASA GSFC 

Supernovae
Astronomical objects discovered in 2003
Boötes